Bertram Cooper (January 10, 1966 – May 10, 2019), nicknamed Smokin' Bert Cooper, was an American professional boxer who competed between 1984 and 2012. He fought Evander Holyfield, George Foreman, Riddick Bowe, Michael Moorer, Chris Byrd, Ray Mercer, and Corrie Sanders, among others. Cooper challenged three times for a world title, and was known for being in several wild fights, including his world title bouts with Holyfield and Moorer.

Professional career
Cooper came out of Philadelphia and was trained in his early years by ex-champ Joe Frazier, and rose in the rankings with a series of explosive knockouts in the Cruiserweight division. Unable to get a world title shot despite winning the NABF belt and defeating Olympic gold medallist Henry Tillman and future world champion Tyrone Booze, he began boxing in the heavyweight division, knocking out Willie DeWitt in 2 rounds but being stopped in 8 rounds by No. 1 ranked heavyweight contender Carl "The Truth" Williams and in 2 rounds by George Foreman.

In 1990, having failed to secure a cruiserweight world title fight, Cooper moved to heavyweight permanently, knocking out top 5-ranked Orlin Norris and claiming his NABF title. He lost the title in his first defense, outpointed over 12 by undefeated Olympic gold medallist Ray Mercer in an explosive brawl. Later the same year he was KO'd in 2 rounds by fast-rising Riddick Bowe and his career looked over. However Cooper bounced back in 1991, stopping Joe Hipp in 5 rounds then being matched on short notice with Evander Holyfield for the undisputed heavyweight championship after two opponents dropped out. Cooper came off the floor in the first round to stun Holyfield in the 3rd round (scoring the first knockdown of Holyfield in the process), the two exchanging big blows before the referee Mills Lane stopped the fight in the 7th.

The fight made Cooper a big name and he would be matched in many high-profile fights over the years. In June 1992 he boxed undefeated Michael Moorer for the vacant WBO title, knocking Moorer down twice but also going down twice himself before being stopped in the 5th. Cooper's career went downhill from this point, being outpointed by veteran Mike Weaver for an obscure title in China then losing to prospects like Corrie Sanders, Chris Byrd, Fres Oquendo, and Joe Mesi. On June 18, 2010, Cooper, aged 44, made a successful comeback after eight years out of the ring, a sixth-round knockout of Corey Winfield in Winston-Salem, North Carolina.

Personal
His hometown was Sharon Hill, Pennsylvania, United States. He was 5'11" (180 cm) tall. He died on May 10, 2019 from pancreatic cancer at the age of 53.

Professional boxing record

References

External links
 

|-

|-

|-

Heavyweight boxers
1966 births
2019 deaths
Boxers from Philadelphia
People from Sharon Hill, Pennsylvania
American male boxers
Deaths from pancreatic cancer